The Apollo Arrow is a mid-engine, 2-seater concept car developed by Apollo Automobil. It was introduced in 2016 at the Geneva Motor Show.

Production 

The Arrow was co-developed by Scuderia Cameron Glickenhaus (SCG) and Apollo Automobil, while Roland Gumpert was CEO of Apollo. It was planned that an Italian company MAT, the company that builds the SCG 003C would be appointed to produce the production version of the car. SCG stated that a production version of the Arrow would consist of a track only version with a V12 engine, code named 'Titan,' in 2017, followed by a road going version called the Apollo S with a twin-turbocharged V8 engine, and that both models will “utilise the chassis technology developed for the SCG003C”, but as of 2018 neither model has reached production stages primarily due to the management of Apollo Automobil focusing on the development of a separate model.

Specifications and performance 
Power is sent to the rear wheels through a 7-speed CIMA sequential manual transmission. The Arrow is built on a tubular chromoly space frame combined with a carbon fibre tub, the design of which is a modified version of the one used in the original Gumpert Apollo, and subsequently the 2016 ApolloN concept. Apollo claims the Arrow weighs under .

References

External links 

Rear mid-engine, rear-wheel-drive vehicles
Sports cars
Concept cars
Cars introduced in 2016